Gagliano may refer to:

 Gagliano (surname)
 Gagliano family of luthiers
 Gagliano (fiction), a fictional town in the novel Christ Stopped at Eboli
 Gagliano (grape), another name for the Italian wine grape Aglianico

Places
 Gagliano Aterno, Abruzzo, Italy
 Gagliano Castelferrato, Sicily, Italy
 Gagliano del Capo, Lecce, Apulia, Italy
 Gagliano, Cividale del Friuli, part of the town of Cividale del Friuli, Italy

See also
 Galliano (disambiguation)
 Galeano (disambiguation)